The 1983 Marshall Thundering Herd football team was an American football team that represented Marshall University in the Southern Conference (SoCon) during the 1983 NCAA Division I-AA football season. In its fifth season under head coach Sonny Randle, the team compiled a 4–7 record (3–4 against conference opponents) and played its home games at Fairfield Stadium in Huntington, West Virginia.

Schedule

References

Marshall
Marshall Thundering Herd football seasons
Marshall Thundering Herd football